The 2017 Argentine Republic motorcycle Grand Prix was the second round of the 2017 MotoGP season. It was held at the Autódromo Termas de Río Hondo in Santiago del Estero on 9 April 2017. Both Repsol Honda riders crashed out of the race, thus marking their first double retirement since the 2015 Argentine Grand Prix.

Classification

MotoGP

Moto2

Moto3

Championship standings after the race

MotoGP
Below are the standings for the top five riders and constructors after round two has concluded.

Riders' Championship standings

Constructors' Championship standings

 Note: Only the top five positions are included for both sets of standings.

Moto2

Moto3

Notes

References

Argentine
Motorcycle Grand Prix
Argentine Republic motorcycle Grand Prix
Argentine